Limestone Peak is a  mountain summit located in British Columbia, Canada.

Description
Limestone Peak is situated on the western boundary of Kootenay National Park at the northern end of the Vermilion Range, which is a sub-range of the Canadian Rockies. The peak also anchors the northern end of what is known as the Rockwall which is an escarpment of the Vermilion Range. Helmet Falls, located one kilometer west of the peak, is another scenic feature of the Rockwall area. Neighbors include Mount Goodsir eight kilometers to the west-northwest and Mount Drysdale four kilometers to the south-southeast. Precipitation runoff from the mountain drains to the Vermilion River via Helmet Creek and Ochre Creek. Topographic relief is significant as the summit rises over 1,100 meters (3,609 feet) above Helmet Creek in one kilometer (0.6 mile). Limestone Peak is composed of Ottertail limestone, a sedimentary rock laid down during the Cambrian period and pushed east and over the top of younger rock during the Laramide orogeny. The mountain's toponym was officially adopted in 1952 by the Geographical Names Board of Canada.

Climate

Based on the Köppen climate classification, Limestone Peak is located in a subarctic climate zone with cold, snowy winters, and mild summers. Winter temperatures can drop below −20 °C with wind chill factors below −30 °C. This climate supports the Washmawapta Glacier on the peak's south slope.

See also
 Geography of British Columbia

References

External links

 Weather: Limestone Peak
 Parks Canada web site: Kootenay National Park

Two-thousanders of British Columbia
Canadian Rockies
Kootenay Land District
Kootenay National Park